As of May 2021, Iberia flies to 26 domestic and 64 international destinations across Africa, the Americas, Asia and Europe. This list does not include irregular charters and destinations served by Air Nostrum operating as Iberia Regional or Iberia Express.

List

 With a crew change in Santo Domingo, Dominican Republic.

References

External links 
Destination guide

Lists of airline destinations
Oneworld destinations
Destinations